Richard David Palliser (born 18 September 1981) is an English chess player and chess writer who holds the title International Master.

Palliser was joint British Rapidplay Chess Champion in 2006. He writes regularly for Everyman Chess who also employ him as an editor and advisor.

His handle on the Internet Chess Club is "worcester".

References

Bibliography

External links
 
 
 Richard Palliser's bibliography at Everyman Chess publisher
 www.whiterosechess.co.uk

1981 births
Living people
English chess players
British chess writers
Chess International Masters